Karacurun is a village in the Karkamış District, Gaziantep Province, Turkey. The village had a population of 156 in 2022 and is inhabited by Turkmens of the Barak tribe.

References

Villages in Karkamış District